Treasure hunting is the physical search for treasure. For example, treasure hunters try to find sunken shipwrecks and retrieve artifacts with market value. This industry is generally fueled by the market for antiquities. The practice of treasure-hunting can be controversial, as locations such as sunken wrecks or cultural sites may be protected by national or international law concerned with property ownership, marine salvage, sovereign or state vessels, commercial diving regulations, protection of cultural heritage and trade controls.

Treasure hunting can also refer to geocaching  a sport in which participants use GPS units to find hidden caches of toys or trinkets, or various other treasure-hunting games.

History 

In 1643, Massachusetts treasure hunter Sir William Phips salvaged a sunken Spanish treasure ship which had been wrecked on the Ambrosia Bank in 1599. The total worth of the treasures salvaged came in at £205,536. The Nuestra Señora de Atocha left Havana bound for Spain in 1622, foundering during the voyage. American treasure hunter Mel Fisher and his crew spent sixteen years searching for the shipwreck of the Nuestra Señora de Atocha. The SS Central America sank after running into a hurricane off the Carolina coast in 1857. In 1987, Thomas G. Thompson discovered the ship's location. A ROUV surfaced more than forty million dollars in gold from the sunken ship.

In 1782 the EIC East Indiaman Grosvenor sank off the Cape Colony while carrying a cargo of 2,000 silver ingots, 720 gold ingots, and several jewels of unknown value. In 1952, a British crew recovered almost 1 million pound's worth of the £5.3 million cargo, which was hidden in Brazil to avoid being taxed by the British government. The SS Laurentic, on a voyage from Liverpool to Halifax in 1917, collided with a mine and sunk with a gold cargo worth five million pounds. Lieutenant Commander G.C.C. Damant was appointed to salvage the ship by the British Admiralty. Damant, aided by John Haldane, discovered the cause and prevention of decompression sickness ("the bends") allowing them to make deeper dives. Over seven seasons, all but 25 gold bars were recovered by Damant and his crew. In 2002, the Odyssey Marine Exploration entered into an arrangement with the British government in finding HMS Sussex which carried 10 tons of gold coins onboard. The ship foundered in 1694 off the coast of Gibraltar. In 2009, Englishman Terry Herbert found a hoard of Anglo-Saxon gold and silver metalwork, which was termed the Staffordshire Hoard. The very same year, Scotsman David Booth found four gold torques from the first century B.C. in Stirling, Scotland.

Actors 

Since the late 1990s, reacting against increasingly energetic efforts by the international community to stop the destruction of the world submerged cultural heritage, treasure hunting companies started hiring archaeologists and marketing directors, making public statements about their good intentions. Even where good quality archaeological research is carried out by archaeologists working with treasure hunters, concerns remain that treasure hunting, by definition, ignores the principle that in-situ preservation of cultural heritage should always be considered first, and that the sale of recovered artifacts breaks up the assemblage of cultural heritage material, resulting in a loss of opportunity to study the whole picture.   The counter argument is that professional salvors have the resources to fund archaeological research of sites that would otherwise be unrecorded, and be subject to destruction by looting or natural forces.

The early stages of the development of archaeology included a significant aspect of treasure hunting; Heinrich Schliemann's excavations at Troy, and later at Mycenae, both turned up significant finds of golden artifacts. Early work in Egyptology also included a similar motive. Modern amateur treasure hunters use relatively inexpensive metal detectors to locate finds at terrestrial sites.

Underwater archaeologist and sometime treasure hunter Peter Throckmorton, in a paper he wrote in 1969 as part of a Historical Archaeology Forum on E. Lee Spence's salvage of a Civil War blockade runner, addressing the question of whether treasure hunting and archaeology are in conflict, stated: “The foregoing discussion may seem like an attack on Mr. Spence. I do not mean this to be so. A whole new branch of archaeology, that of Mycenaean studies, was founded by Heinrich Schliemann, who also had the courage to remember his dreams … It is right to dream, and it would be the worst kind of mistake on the part of the state to discourage the big dreams of men like Mr. Spence, and to let a project requiring that sort of enterprise fall into the hands of what Mr. Spence's friend terms ‘some bloody historical society’ which might lay the dead hand of unimaginative and stereotyped thinking on Mr. Spence's courage and ability.” In 1972, Spence and Throckmorton, along with three other men, were awarded the degree of Doctor of Marine Histories by the College of Marine Arts on July 16, 1972, becoming first people in the world to be awarded a doctorate for work in marine archaeology.

More recently, most serious treasure hunters have started working underwater, where modern technology allows access to wrecks containing valuables, which were previously inaccessible. Starting with the diving suit, and moving on through Scuba and later to ROVs, each new generation of technology has made more wrecks accessible. Many of these wrecks have resulted in the treasure salvage of many fascinating artifacts from Spanish treasure fleets as well as many others.

Equipment
Rubberised suits, weighted belts and shoes, and helmets are used for deep-sea diving. Diving bells, open helmets, atmospheric diving suits were used. Deep-sea exploration today is accomplished using Self-Contained Underwater Breathing Apparatus ("SCUBA"), unmanned submersible vehicles, Remote Operating Vehicles ("ROVs"),  and exposure suits. Sound Navigation and Ranging ("Sonar") and magnetometers are used for detection of treasure. Hand tools, probes, screens, containers, shovels, metal detectors, and sifters are useful for land treasure hunting (Smith, 1971).  The Evinrude Aquanaut is a portable floating diving unit that feeds air directly to the divers without need of tanks on the divers.
In diving, masks allow for improved vision, fins increase swimming speeds, safety vests provide lifesaving assistance, diver's flags alert others of a diver's location, wetsuits conserve body heat and also provide skin protection, weight belts offset buoyancy of rubber suits, knives prove useful as a tool, tanks supply air, and snorkels conserve energy.

Legality
In 1906, the Secretaries of the Interior of Agriculture and War made an act for the preservation of American Antiquities (ancient artifacts).  This act says that each  of the Interior would have their own specific authority over different artifacts or locations based on their department. These artifacts and locations are as follows: Historic landmarks, historic monuments, objects of antiquity, objects of scientific value and historical value.  The Secretary of Agriculture has jurisdiction over artifacts and monuments found within the outer limits of forest reserves.  The secretary of War for any land that resides in or near a military reserve.  The lands that are controlled by the US Government will be supervised by the respective Secretary. Permits will not be granted to those trying to move or take any monument or artifact that can be preserved in its original place and remain an ancient monument. A permit will not be granted to someone "whose eyes are bigger than their stomach." In other words, those trying to explore a vast amount of area with little help and the job seems to not be done within the time limit designated by the certain someone, that permit will not be granted. Each permit will be granted by the respective Secretaries that have jurisdiction over those certain sites. Also including to the permit just stated above you also need these following requirements: The name of the Institution making the request, how much time it will take, the date, the person in charge of the project, what type of project it is going to be, excavating, gathering or examining, and the museum where the artifact will be shown and preserved. Each permit will only be granted for 3 years or less.  An extension can be granted if progress is shown. Permits will not be in effect if work does not begin within six months of getting the permit.

The United States federal Abandoned Shipwrecks Act, which asserts the federal government's ownership of abandoned United States water shipwrecks, was put into place in 1988. Any shipwreck that is embedded in submerged lands and/or in coralline formations protected by a State on submerged lands of a state is property of the government. The Abandoned Shipwrecks Act then transfers ownership to the appropriate State government. The Supreme Court upheld the Abandoned Shipwrecks Act constitutionality in 1998. In the US, the finder of a ship not abandoned could seek a salvage award.
The countries England, Wales, and Northern Ireland claim gold and silver finds that are more than three hundred years old for the crown by way of the Treasure Act of 1996. Any found treasure in these nations must be reported within fourteen days of uncovering.

The United States awards ownership to the landowner. If finds occur on federal land it can be considered a federal offense. Most of the United States prosecutes the unearthing of burial grounds.

Criticism
Treasure hunting is condemned by a growing number of nations, and UNESCO issued a charter for the protection of the underwater cultural heritage in 2001: the UNESCO Convention on the Protection of the Underwater Cultural Heritage. This convention is a legal instrument helping states parties to improve the protection of their underwater cultural heritage. In 2013 the National Geographic Channel set off a firestorm of controversy with its reality show Diggers. Professional archaeologists from the Society for Historical Archaeology, the largest scholarly group concerned with the archaeology of the modern world (A.D. 1400–present), roundly criticised the network for promoting the theft of cultural materials on public and private land.

Notable treasure hunters 

 Martin Bayerle located the shipwreck of RMS Republic in 1981.
 Brent Brisben founder of 1715 Fleet - Queens Jewels, LLC owners of the identified remains of the 1715 Plate Fleet. 
 John Chatterton (discoverer of the Pirate Ship of Joseph Bannsister Golden Fleece)
 Mel Fisher (discoverer of the Spanish galleon Nuestra Señora de Atocha)
 Cork Graham (war correspondent, author)
 Mike Hatcher (discoverer of the "Nanking Cargo")
 Robert F. Marx (underwater archaeologist, author)
 John Mattera (author and discoverer of the Pirate Ship of Joseph Bannsister Golden Fleece)
 Juan Ponce de León  (searched the new world for gold and the Fountain of Youth)
 E. Lee Spence (pioneer underwater archaeologist, discoverer of the Hunley, SS Ozama, SS Georgiana. etc.)
 Phillip Masters discovered Blackbeard's flagship, the Queen Anne's Revenge in 1996.

Notable treasure hunting companies 
 Columbus-America Discovery Group located and salvaged treasure from 1857 shipwreck of the SS Central America, using research by Dr. E. Lee Spence
 Intersal, Inc., while working under permit from the state of North Carolina, discovered the pirate Blackbeard's flagship, the Queen Anne's Revenge, on November 21, 1996.
 Lords Of Fortune LLC is engaged in the recovery of The Tsar's Treasure from the famous treasure shipwreck RMS Republic.
 Odyssey Marine Exploration located and salvaged treasure from 1865 shipwreck of the SS Republic, using research by Dr. E. Lee Spence
 Shipwrecks, Inc. chartered in 1967 by Dr. E. Lee Spence, received 1st salvage license issued in South Carolina, for work on CSS Georgiana
 Treasure Salvors, Inc., founded by Mel Fisher, located the Nuestra Señora de Atocha wreck and its mother lode of silver, gold and emeralds, in July 1985.

See also
 Black Swan Project
 Buried treasure
 Geocaching
 Grave robbery
 Letterboxing
 List of missing treasures
 List of lost mines
 Magnet fishing
 Marine salvage
 Metal detector
 Nuestra Señora de Atocha
 Oak Island
 On the Trail of the Golden Owl
 RMS Republic
 Shipwreck
 The Secret (treasure hunt)
 Treasure hunt (game)

References

Further reading
Bass, George F.  "After the Diving is Over," Underwater Archaeology Proceedings, Toni Carrell, ed., Society for Historical Archaeology, 1990,  10-13.
Bass, George F.  "The Men Who Stole the Stars," INA Newsletter, Vol. 15, No. 2, 11.
Burgess, Robert E. Sunken Treasure (Dodd, Mead; New York; 1988)
Castro, Filipe. "Treasure Hunting", 
Draper, Robert.  "Indian Takers," Texas Monthly, March, 1993, 104-107, 121-124.
Elia, Ricardo.  "Nautical Shenanigans [review of book Walking the Plank]," Archaeology, Vol. 48, No. 1, January–February, 1995, 79-84.
 Graham, C., The Bamboo Chest; 2004
Haldane, Cheryl.  "The Abandoned Shipwreck Act," INA Newsletter, Vol. 15, No. 2, 9.

Renfrew, Colin, Loot, Legitimacy and Ownership. London: Duckworth, 2000.
 E. Lee Spence, Treasures of the Confederate Coast: the "Real Rhett Butler" & Other Revelations (Narwhal Press, Charleston/Miami, 1995)
Throckmorton, Peter.  "The World's Worst Investment: The Economics of Treasure Hunting with Real Life Comparisons," Underwater Archaeology Proceedings, Toni Carrell, ed.,  Society for Historical Archaeology, 1990,  6-10.
United States Senate.  Public Law 100-298 [S. 858], Abandoned Shipwreck Act of 1987, April 28, 1988 (Courtesy of Calvin R. Cummings).

External links
N.C Supreme Court revives lawsuit over Blackbeard’s ship and lost Spanish treasure ship, Fayetteville Observer
 Two firms seek ship, Carolina Coast Online
 Treasure hunter in race to uncover ship of riches, Google
 Philip Masters, True Amateur of History, Dies at 70, New York Times
 Shipwrecks and Treasure: the Spanish Treasure Fleet of 1750
Treasure hunter that found Blackbeard's pirate ship sues state for $8.2 million, Fayetteville Observer
Lawmakers enter legal battle over Blackbeard's ship, News & Observer
 PI and VLF technology for underwater treasure hunting

Treasure